Daniel Brodhead I (c. 1631 – July 14, 1667) of Yorkshire, England served as a royalist and Captain of Grenadiers of the army of Charles II of England.

Biography
He was born circa 1631 in Yorkshire, England. Under an expedition led by Colonel Richard Nichols in 1664, Brodhead played a role in the capture of New Netherland. He settled in Marbletown, New York in 1665. He died on July 14, 1667 in Esopus, New York.

Legacy
His grandson Daniel Brodhead II settled the area of Stroudsburg, Pennsylvania, and his great-grandson Daniel Brodhead was a noted leader during the American Revolutionary War.

English emigrants
17th-century American people
Military personnel from Yorkshire
People from Marbletown, New York
1630s births
1667 deaths
Cavaliers
Military personnel of the Anglo-Dutch Wars